Miss International 2018, the 58th Miss International pageant, was held on November 9, 2018, at the Tokyo Dome City Hall in Tokyo, Japan. Kevin Liliana from Indonesia crowned her successor Mariem Velazco from Venezuela at the end of the event. This marks Venezuela's eighth victory at Miss International - the most in the pageant's history. This is the third time in Miss International history that the finals night saw the return of the previous year's runners-up to crown their respective successors. This year Miss International comeback edition with the theme "Cheer All Woman" alongside Miss International Japan 2019.

A total of 78 contestants from countries and territories competed in this year's Miss International pageant, surpassing the previous record of 73 contestants in 2014, making the biggest turnout in the pageant's history.

The pageant was hosted by Tetsuya Bessho on his fifth consecutive year of Miss International.

Background
On April 12, 2018, it was announced during a website conference by Akemi Shimomura, the president of the International Cultural Association and the president of Miss International Organization, that the 2018 pageant would be held in Tokyo Dome City Hall, Bunkyo, Tokyo, Japan, for the third consecutive year on Friday, November 9, 2018.

Results

Placements

Order of announcements

Top 15

Top 8

Continental queens

Special awards

Pageant 
Unlike in 2017 contestants were classified under five continents: (1) Europe, (2) Oceania, (3) Africa, (4) Americas, and (5) Asia. During the Competitions Rounds; National Costume, Swimwear, and Evening Gown, then the contestants were trimmed down to 15 Semifinalists, after which, the judges narrowed the finalists down to the Top 8, then judges decided the Top 8 to compete in the question and answer portion. and then the judges choose Top 5 which Miss International 2018 and her four Runners-up like 2017 format.

Contestants
 
77 contestants competed for the title.
{| class="wikitable sortable" style="font-size:95%;"  
|-  
! Country or territory || Contestant || Age || Hometown || Continental group
|-
| Argentina||Rocío Magali Pérez||22||Buenos Aires||Americas
|-
| Aruba||Stephanie Anouk Eman ||26||Oranjestad||Americas 
|-
| Australia||Emily Tokić||20||Canberra||Oceania
|-
| Belgium || Kelly Quanten|| 24 || Leuven||Europe
|-
| Bolivia||María Elena Antelo||24 ||Beni||Americas
|-
| Brazil||Stephanie Pröglhöf||24||São José dos Campos||Americas
|-
| Canada||Camila Gonzalez|| 21 ||Toronto||Americas
|-
| Chile||María Pía Vilches||22 ||La Ligua||Americas  
|-
| China||Wang Chaoyuan||24 ||Tianjin||Asia
|-
| Colombia||Anabella Castro||21  ||Valledupar||Americas
|-
| Cook Islands||Louisa Purea||20||Avarua||Oceania
|-
| Costa Rica||Glennys Medina Segura ||23||Guanacaste||Americas
|-
| Cote d'Ivoire||Jemima Gbato ||21||Abidjan||Africa
|-
| Cuba||Jennifer Alvarez Ruiz|| 24 ||Havana||Americas
|-
| Curaçao||Diona Angela ||21||Willemstad||Americas 
|-
| Czech Republic||Daniela Zálešáková || 19||Most||Europe
|-
| Denmark||Louise Arild||23||Frederiksberg||Europe 
|-
| Dominican Republic||Stéphanie Bustamante||25||Paterson||Americas  
|-
| Ecuador||Michelle Huet||23||Guayaquil||Americas
|-
| Egypt||Farah Sedky||24||Cairo||Africa  
|-
| El Salvador||Ena Cea|| 20 ||Santa Ana||Americas
|-
| Ethiopia||Frezewd Solomon||21||Addis Ababa||Africa
|-
| Finland||Eevi Ihalainen||18||Lappeenranta||Europe
|-
| France||Mélanie Labat||23||Poussan||Europe
|-
| Germany||Franciska Acs || 23 || Düsseldorf||Europe
|-
| Ghana||Benedicta Nana Adjei|| 22 ||Accra||Africa
|-
| Guadeloupe||Sarah Eruam||18||Le Gosier||Americas
|-
| Guam||Diliana Tuncap|| 22 ||Hagåtña||Oceania
|-
| Guatemala||Gabriela Castillo||20||Guatemala City||Americas 
|-
| Haiti||Cassandra Chéry || 23 || Port-au-Prince||Americas
|-
| Hawaii||Olivia Evelyn Walls||21 || Honolulu||Oceania
|-
| Honduras||Valeria Cardona ||20||Tegucigalpa||Americas
|-
| Hong Kong||Carmaney Wong||24||Kowloon||Asia
|-
| Hungary||Frida Maczkó||22||Vác||Europe
|-
| India||Tanishqa Bhosale||19||Pune||Asia
|-
| Indonesia ||Vania Fitryanti||21||Tangerang||Asia
|-
| Japan||Hinano Sugimoto||21||Tokyo||Asia
|-
| Kenya||Ivy Nyangasi Mido||22||Nairobi||Africa
|-
| Korea||Yejin Seo||21||Seoul||Asia
|-
| ||Piyamarth Phounpaseuth|| 24 ||Vientiane Prefecture||Asia
|-
| Lebanon||Rachel Younan||23||Beirut||Asia
|-
| Macau||Cherry Chin||24||Taipa||Asia
|-
| Madagascar||Esmeralda Malleka||25||Vohemar||Africa
|-
| Malaysia||Mandy Loo||22||Georgetown||Asia
|-
| Mauritius||Ashna Nookooloo||22||Curepipe||Africa
|-
| Mexico ||Nebai Torres||25||Guadalajara||Americas
|-
| Moldova||Daniela Marin||19||Leova||Europe
|-
| Mongolia||Munkhchimeg Batjargal||20||Ulaanbaatar||Asia
|-
|  Myanmar ||May Yu Khatar||19||Yangon||Asia
|-
|  Nepal ||Ronali Amatya|| 22 || Kathmandu||Asia
|-
|  Netherlands ||Zoë Amber Niewold || 20||Assen||Europe
|-
| New Zealand||Natasha Kristina Unkovich||24 ||East Auckland||Oceania
|-
| Nicaragua||Stefanía Alemán||27||Masaya||Americas
|-
| Northern Marianas||Celine Cabrera||23||Saipan||Oceania
|-
|  Panama||Shirel Ortiz|| 22 || Panama City||Americas
|-
| Paraguay||Daisy Diana Lezcano Rojas|| 24||San Lorenzo||Americas
|-
| Peru||Marelid Elizabeth Medina|| 24 || Callao||Americas
|-
|  Philippines ||Ahtisa Manalo||21 || Candelaria||Asia
|-
| Poland||Marta Pałucka||26||Sopot||Europe
|-
| Portugal||Carina Neto|| 21 || Gondomar||Europe
|-
| Puerto Rico||Yarelis Salgado||24||Toa Alta||Americas
|-
| Romania||Bianca Tirsin||20||Arad||Europe
|-
| Russia||Galina Lukina||26||Ufa||Asia
|-
| Singapore||Eileen Feng||22|| Singapore City||Asia
|-
| Slovakia||Radka Grendová||20||Revúca||Europe
|-
| South Africa||Reabetswe Sechoaro||24||Pretoria||Africa
|-
| Spain||Susana Sánchez||25||Huelva||Europe
|-
| Sri Lanka||Natalee Fernando||24||Colombo||Asia
|-
| Sweden||Izabell Hahn||26||Linköping||Europe
|-
| Chinese Taipei||Kao Man-jung||21||Taichung||Asia
|-
| Thailand|| Keeratiga Jaruratjamon || 23 || Phitsanulok||Asia
|-
| Ukraine||Bohdana Tarasyk||23||Kryvyi Rih||Europe
|-
| United Kingdom||Sharon Gaffka||22||Oxford||Europe
|-
| United States||Bonnie Walls||24||New York City||Americas
|-
| Venezuela||Mariem Velazco||20||San Tomé||Americas
|-
| Vietnam||Nguyễn Thúc Thùy Tiên||20||Ho Chi Minh City||Asia
|-
| Zimbabwe||Tania Tatenda Aaron||22||Harare||Africa
|-
|}

Notes
Returns
Last competed in 1961:
 Last competed in 1999:
 Last competed in 2011:
 Last competed in 2014:
  Last competed in 2015:
  Last competed in 2016:
        Replacements

 Designations 

 Withdrawals 
  – The organization of Miss International Belarus made an announcement that Margarita Martynova couldn't compete in this year pageant due to lack of preparation and scheduling conflict with the other international pageant that she wanted to compete.
  – The organization of Miss International Cambodia made an announcement that Dy Sokrakheta can't compete in this year pageant due to lack preparation, Visa problem and sponsorship.
  – Miss International Gibraltar 2018, Lilly Gomez can't compete in this year pageant because to lack of preparation.
  – No national pageant was held due to lack of sponsorship. The organization of Miss International Lithuania also made an announcement that they will not be appointing anybody to compete in this year's pageant.
  – Miss International Norway 2018, Helene Abildnes can't compete in this year pageant for personal reasons.
  – Miss International Sierra Leone 2018, Michaella Oladuni Tommy can't compete this year due to visa problem.
 ''' – Miss International Tunisia, Dorsaf Zouaghi was handpicked to compete in this year, but she can't compete in this year's pageant because of scheduling conflict with the other international pageant that she wants to compete.

References

External links

2018
2018 in Tokyo
2018 beauty pageants
Beauty pageants in Japan
November 2018 events in Japan